The 1947 Chicago Cubs season was the 76th season of the Chicago Cubs franchise, the 72nd in the National League and the 32nd at Wrigley Field. The Cubs finished sixth in the National League with a record of 69–85.

Offseason 
 November 21, 1946: Jim Brosnan was signed as an amateur free agent by the Cubs.

Regular season 
 May 18: 46,572 paying fans (while there were 20,000 fans outside) came to Wrigley Field to see Jackie Robinson of the Brooklyn Dodgers play. The Dodgers won by a score of 4–2.

Season standings

Record vs. opponents

Roster

Player stats

Batting

Starters by position 
Note: Pos = Position; G = Games played; AB = At bats; H = Hits; Avg. = Batting average; HR = Home runs; RBI = Runs batted in

Other batters 
Note: G = Games played; AB = At bats; H = Hits; Avg. = Batting average; HR = Home runs; RBI = Runs batted in

Pitching

Starting pitchers 
Note: G = Games pitched; IP = Innings pitched; W = Wins; L = Losses; ERA = Earned run average; SO = Strikeouts

Other pitchers 
Note: G = Games pitched; IP = Innings pitched; W = Wins; L = Losses; ERA = Earned run average; SO = Strikeouts

Relief pitchers 
Note: G = Games pitched; W = Wins; L = Losses; SV = Saves; ERA = Earned run average; SO = Strikeouts

Farm system 

 
LEAGUE CHAMPIONS: Los Angeles, Clinton, Sioux Falls

References

External links
1947 Chicago Cubs season at Baseball Reference

Chicago Cubs seasons
Chicago Cubs season
Chicago Cubs